Laura Lorenza Morfin Macouzet (born 9 January 1982 in Cuernavaca, Morelos) is a road cyclist from Mexico. She represented her nation at the 2006, 2008 and 2009 UCI Road World Championships.

See also
List of people from Morelos, Mexico

References

External links
 profile at Procyclingstats.com

1982 births
Living people
Mexican female cyclists
Sportspeople from Cuernavaca
Cyclists at the 2007 Pan American Games
Cyclists at the 2011 Pan American Games
Cyclists at the 2015 Pan American Games
Pan American Games medalists in cycling
Pan American Games silver medalists for Mexico
Pan American Games bronze medalists for Mexico
Medalists at the 2007 Pan American Games
21st-century Mexican women
20th-century Mexican women